José Davert (1874–1934) was a French film actor.

Selected filmography
 The House of Mystery (1923)
 The Man Without Nerves (1924)
 Adventure on the Night Express (1925)
 The Phantom of the Moulin Rouge (1925)
 Zigano (1925)
 Swifter Than Death (1925)
 The Secret Courier (1928)
 Figaro (1929)
 Men Without Work (1929)
 Maurin of the Moors (1932)

References

Bibliography
 Goble, Alan. The Complete Index to Literary Sources in Film. Walter de Gruyter, 1999.

External links

1874 births
1934 deaths
French male film actors
French male silent film actors
20th-century French male actors
Male actors from Marseille